Juan Antonio Rodríguez Duflox, known as Juanín (born 10 January 1937) is a Spanish former professional footballer who played as a midfielder.

Career
Born in San Sebastián, Juanín played for Real Sociedad.

References

1937 births
Living people
Spanish footballers
Real Sociedad footballers
Association football midfielders